is a former Grand Prix motorcycle road racer. He was exclusively a 125 class rider. Ueda began his Grand Prix career with a win in his inaugural race at the 1991 Japanese Grand Prix. His best seasons were in 1994, when he finished second in the 125cc world championship behind Kazuto Sakata and in 1997, when he finished second behind Valentino Rossi. 

In 1995, Nobuatsu (Noboru) Ueda fell off his bike, breaking his arm and receiving nerve damage that nearly paralyzed his right hand. This injury led to him wearing the first mechanised glove (produced by Spidi) that gave him the ability to grip the throttle and brake levers. 

After a twelve-year career in Grand Prix competition, he announced his retirement at the end of the 2002 season, citing the need to let his body recuperate after several racing injuries. Ueda won 13 Grand Prix races during his career. He now runs his own team known as Team Nobby, which competes in the All Japan Road Race Championship in the J-GP3 class.

Grand Prix career statistics
Points system from 1988 to 1991:

Points system in 1992:

Points system from 1993 onwards:

(key) (Races in bold indicate pole position; races in italics indicate fastest lap)

References 

Japanese motorcycle racers
125cc World Championship riders
1967 births
Living people
People from Tahara, Aichi
Sportspeople from Aichi Prefecture